The Sabah grizzled langur (Presbytis sabana), also known as the Saban grizzled langur, is a species of monkey in the family Cercopithecidae.  It was formerly considered a subspecies of Hose's langur, Presbytis hosei (as Presbytis hosei sabana).  The Sabah grizzled langur is native to the island of Borneo in the province of Sabah in Malaysia, with part of its range in Indonesia.  It is listed as endangered by the IUCN due primarily to habitat loss, fragmentation and hunting.

Description
The Sabah grizzled langur is mostly gray, with white underparts and black hands and feet.

Diet & behaviour
The Sabah grizzled langur is arboreal and diurnal.  It lives in groups of about seven animals including a single adult male.  Males who are not part of a group are solitary.  It has a varied diet consisting of leaves, fruit, seeds, flowers, insects and bark, and it also consumes mineral-rich mud.  It sometimes associates with the maroon langur.

References

Presbytis
Mammals of Malaysia
Mammals of Borneo
Taxa named by Oldfield Thomas
Primates of Indonesia
Mammals described in 1893
Endangered fauna of Asia
Endemic fauna of Borneo